In Hebrew, a "shababnik" is a term for a young Haredi person who leaves his or her faith in some regards but not in others. Shababnikim don't leave the religious community, but bend the boundaries of what is acceptable behavior in Jewish law. The name comes from the Arabic word shabāb meaning "youth".

See also 

 Shababnikim TV series

References

Haredi Judaism